President Biden will make many appointments and nominations to serve in various roles in the Department of Defense. These include the Army, Navy, Marines, and Air Force. Almost all of these nominations will need to be confirmed by the United States Senate before they can begin service. As was the case with Lloyd Austin, a waiver is required if the nominated person has not been out of service for at least seven years.

Below is a list of nominations and appointments to the Department of Defense by Joe Biden, the 46th president of the United States. , according to tracking by The Washington Post and Partnership for Public Service, 54 nominees have been confirmed, 4 nominees are being considered by the Senate, 4 positions do not have nominees, and 4 appointments have been made to positions that don't require Senate confirmation.

Color key 
 Denotes appointees awaiting Senate confirmation.

 Denotes appointees serving in an acting capacity.

 Denotes appointees who have left office or offices which have been disbanded.

Department of Defense

Office of the Secretary of Defense

Joint Chiefs of Staff

Office of the Under Secretary of Defense for Policy

Office of the Under Secretary of Defense (Comptroller)

Office of the Under Secretary of Defense for Acquisition and Sustainment

Office of the Under Secretary of Defense for Intelligence and Security

Office of the Under Secretary of Defense for Personnel and Readiness

Office of the Under Secretary of Defense for Research and Engineering

Offices & Agencies

Department of the Army

Department of the Navy

Department of the Air Force

Withdrawn nominations

See also 
 Cabinet of Joe Biden, for the vetting process undergone by top-level roles including advice and consent by the Senate
 List of executive branch 'czars' e.g. Special Advisor to the President

Notes 

Confirmations by roll call vote

Confirmations by voice vote

References 

 Biden
Defense